Terry Kennedy (born 14 November 1993) is a former English professional footballer who last played as a defender for Guiseley. Born in Barnsley, he spent time at his hometown club as a junior before making the switch to Sheffield United.

Career
Kennedy made his début for the Blades in May 2011, coming on as a substitute in the last game of the 2010–11 season against Swansea City at the Liberty Stadium. Much was expected of Kennedy heading into his second season as a professional with the Blades, but due to a recurring knee problem he missed the majority of the campaign and didn't make a single appearance. After an intense rehabilitation period, Kennedy made his first start for the Blades in away game against Doncaster Rovers on 1 January 2013. Despite only making one appearance during the previous season, Kennedy had his contract with the Blades extended in June 2013. Upon signing a new contract, Kennedy stated "I'm happy to sign a new deal at United... Hopefully, I'll be able to repay the club, both this season and in the future, for the faith they've shown in me." Kennedy's contract with United was extended on 16 May 2014. On 31 January 2015, Kennedy signed a new contract with United keeping him at Bramall Lane until summer 2016.

On 19 November 2015, he signed on loan for Cambridge United until 3 January 2016.

After leaving Sheffield United in 2016, Kennedy played for Alfreton Town, Harrogate Town and Guiseley. A knee injury meant that he had to retire early, Kennedy played his last game in football for Guiseley in the National League North against York City on 29 September 2018 aged 26.

Kennedy's early retirement from football led to him to start working as a builder. In November 2021, Kennedy won £1 million on The National Lottery. The footage of Kennedy finding out he had won the jackpot while on his break at work went viral.

Career statistics

References

External links
 
 Official profile at Sheffield United
 

1993 births
Living people
Footballers from Barnsley
English footballers
Association football defenders
Sheffield United F.C. players
Harrogate Town A.F.C. players
Alfreton Town F.C. players
Cambridge United F.C. players
Guiseley A.F.C. players
English Football League players
National League (English football) players
Lottery winners